Jordan Emanuel is a model, journalist, philanthropist, Playboy's final Playmate of the Year (2019), Playmate of the Month for December 2018, and Miss Black America New York 2018. She is the only Black Playboy Bunny to later became Playmate of the Year  and is a co-founder of the non-profit Women With Voices.

Her story has been covered by Ebony, Bossip, Business Insider, and E! Online among others.

Background 

Jordan Emanuel was born in Baltimore, Maryland and raised in Basking Ridge, New Jersey. Emanuel received a degree from the University of Miami, triple majoring in Broadcast Journalism, Music Business, and Art History.  After graduating, she moved to New York, and pursued a career in journalism and "bringing life to images and converting ideas into thought-provoking video and digital content", contributing content to Hollywood Life and Bossip. She began modeling on a whim, posting "25 Days of Jordan" consecutively on social media, in celebration of her 25th birthday. She has modeled for brands including Rimmel, Cover Girl, and Good American.

Philanthropy 
Jordan co-founded the non-profit organization Women With Voices which provides communal supportive spaces and resources for women. Women with Voices is a Brooklyn, NY based women's empowerment 501(c)3 non-profit organization Emanuel describes the mission as focused on "empowering others."

References

African-American activists
Living people
University of Miami alumni
Miss Black America delegates
People from Somerset County, New Jersey
American women's rights activists
2010s Playboy Playmates
Year of birth missing (living people)
African-American female models
21st-century American women
21st-century African-American women